Ronald Charles Hannaford is an English educator and former rugby union international who represented England in the 1971 Five Nations.

Personal
Hannaford attended The Crypt School in Gloucester and then studied at Durham University, where one of his contemporaries on the university team was future England international Peter Dixon.

He came close to being dismissed from university after an academically disastrous second year, but was saved by the intervention of Zoologist David Barker. After graduating from Durham with a 2:1 he continued his education at Churchill College, Cambridge, and represented Cambridge University R.U.F.C. Hannaford taught Biology at Sherborne School (1968–1970), and later at Clifton College and Millfield. He moved to New Zealand in 1975, but eventually returned to England where he worked at Rendcomb College (1983–1988) and then Seaford College as deputy head. By 1997 he was reportedly retired in France.

Rugby union career
He made his test debut against Wales, scoring a try in a 22–6 defeat. His final international appearance at test level came against France in the same tournament. He later toured the Far East with England, playing against Japan.

References

External links
 

1944 births
Living people
English rugby union players
England international rugby union players
People educated at The Crypt School, Gloucester
Durham University RFC players
Cambridge University R.U.F.C. players
Alumni of Hatfield College, Durham
Alumni of Churchill College, Cambridge
Durham County RFU players
Gloucestershire County RFU players
Rugby union players from Gloucester
Rugby union number eights